Sarigamapadani is a 1994 Indian Tamil-language romantic drama film directed by R. Parthiban and produced by Seetha. The film stars Parthiban, Roja and Sangita, with Vijayakumar, Manorama, Vinu Chakravarthy, Chinni Jayanth and Periya Karuppu Thevar playing supporting roles. It was released on 10 February 1994 and bombed at the box office.

Plot

Kulasekaran is a liquor shop owner and he likes to spend the time in college. Kulasekaran is also a modern Don Juan :  a seducer of women. His father Kabali is a drunkard and he was involved in smuggling illegal liquor, while his mother is a soft-spoken person.

During a wedding function, Kulasekaran falls under the spell of the shy young woman Sangita. He talks to Sangita and he tries to seduce her. Sangita really likes his funny way of talking, she eventually falls in love with him and they even talk about their marriage. When Kulasekaran tries to kiss her, she pushes him away. Disappointed by his behaviour, she runs away from the wedding hall.

Later, Kulasekaran falls in love with Archana. Archana is an arrogant college student and she is the daughter of a district collector. Kulasekaran tries to seduce her but without success. One day, she finally accepts his love, unfortunately, the happiness was short-lived, she says that it was just a joke. The whole pattern repeats itself many times, Kulasekaran quickly sinks into alcoholism and depression. Archana openly states that she wants to see Kulasekaran going mad. What transpires later forms the crux of the story.

Cast

R. Parthiban as Kulasekaran
Roja as Archana
Sangita as Sangita
Vijayakumar as Archana's father
Manorama as Kulasekaran's mother
Vinu Chakravarthy as Kabali
Chinni Jayanth as Kulasekaran's friend
Periya Karuppu Thevar as Kulasekaran grandfather
Vaithi as Headmaster
Prasanna Kumar as lawyer
Thalapathy Dinesh

Soundtrack

The music was composed by Deva, with lyrics written by  Pulamaipithan.

Release and reception
Sarigamapadani was released on 24 August 1995. R. P. R. of Kalki found Manikandan's cinematography as the only positive of the film. The film became a commercial failure at box-office.

References

External links 
 

1990s Tamil-language films
1994 films
1994 romantic drama films
Films scored by Deva (composer)
Indian romantic drama films